Pavaratty is a census town in Thrissur district in the Indian state of Kerala.  Pavaratty is situated in the coastal area of Chavakkad taluk in Thrissur District. The town is about 23 km north-west of Thrissur town and 5 km south of Guruvayoor. It is the site of St. Joseph's Parish Shrine, Pavaratty and also lies near Palayur (4 km), famous for the Palayur Church. Nearby airports are Cochin International Airport (77 km) and Calicut Airport (95 km). The nearest railheads are at Guruvayoor and Thrissur. The Nearest bus stations are Thrissur Bus Station and Guruvayoor Bus Station. From Thrissur, the shortest way to Pavaratty is via Amala-Parappur-Puvathur.

History of Pavaratty
The area called Pavaratty, there are many speculations behind the name of this locality. Some may doubt relations with "Paav – Roti", Andhra Bread. Again many others try to find out a connection between this locality and the English word – 'poverty'. But the older generation is for another view. In old days there were many looms in and around this area. The weavers of this locality used to run the shuttle twice (Paav) twisting the time of thread – "Paav" – put twice (iratty). Anyhow this locality had a significant role in various fields.

Architecture
In architecture, we find "Pavaratty Finish". It is the marble (mirror) finish work done with verily coloured cement coatings that brought this term. The workers of Pavaratty are very much skilled in this art and it was done throughout Kerala by the workers from here. Again, we may find a name in the past, related to pavaratty–Kavalapara. It denotes the present 'Pavaratty Centre'. There was a police post here and hence the name came to be used.

Churches

When talking about Pavaratty, it will always highlight to the St. Joseph's Parish Shrine, Pavaratty.
People from all walks of life, different castes and creed, Throng to the shrine, seeking the blessing of St.Joseph of Pavaratty. St.Joseph pours blessings to the childless, sick and poor and through his protective mantle. The magnificent and miraculous Status of St.Joseph has been installed at the top of the Main altar of the church.

Demographics
 India census, Pavaratty had a population of 10,823. Males constitute 45% of the population and females 55%. Pavaratty has an average literacy rate of 84%, higher than the national average of 59.5%: male literacy is 85%, and female literacy is 83%. In Pavaratty, 11% of the population is under 6 years of age.

Educational Institutions near by Pavaratty
Sir Syed English School, Pavaratty, recognised by CBSE, working since 1995. 04872644764

St.Joseph's College of Arts & Science, Mother Arts & Science College (unaided-Recognised by University of Calicut) 
Address : Poovathur; near by Peruvallur; Thrissur.

THOIBA women's college [WAFIYYA] Venmenad

Under [cicwafy ]

Al Birr Islamic pre school Venmenad

Tourist place

Koorikkad; painkanniyuur

References

External links
Pavaratty News - പാവറട്ടി വിശേഷം 
Timeline of Thrissur
Official website of St.Joseph's Parish Shrine, Pavaratty
St. Joseph's HSS Pavaratty website

Cities and towns in Thrissur district
Guruvayur